J. J. Wright may refer to:

 J.J. Wright (composer), American sacred jazz composer and conductor
 J. J. Wright (DJ), American disc jockey from Boston